Scopula acidalia is a moth of the family Geometridae. It was described by William Jacob Holland in 1894. It is found in the Democratic Republic of the Congo, Equatorial Guinea and Ivory Coast.

References

Moths described in 1894
Moths of Africa
acidalia
Taxa named by William Jacob Holland